Doncaster College and University Centre is a further and higher education college based in Doncaster, South Yorkshire, England. It is an operating division of the DN Colleges Group.

History

Origins
The origin and identity of Doncaster College can be traced back to the early history of technical education in the area. From about 1870, further education was delivered at a variety of small locations within the town.

It all started through two evening classes in Great Northern Science and Art, taught by Mr L H Branston, who was a school master by day and artist by night. These classes were held in the St James’ School (or the great Northern Railway School). The first subjects taught were freehand and perspective drawing and machine construction.

The Science and Art department at South Kensington ran the courses until education responsibility was taken over by West Riding County Council in 1887.

Doncaster Technical College
Following national legislation, changed technical education arrangements culminated in the appointment of the first Principal of Doncaster Technical College, George Grace. At the time he said: "To the man with scientific knowledge and tastes the world grows more beautiful day by day: as his knowledge gets deeper and deeper. Nature offers ever-increasing sources of delight."

Doncaster Technical College began the development of a centre dedicated to Science, Art and Technology, which would open in 1915 as Church View, a building erected next to St George's Minster.

Doncaster College of Education
In 1947, around 4,850 students were enrolled on 985 classes and the college was running out of room and needed expansion. Church view was expanded yet again but it was obvious more needed to be done.

The house and gardens at High Melton were converted to a Teacher Training Centre, known as Doncaster College of Education. It was founded by the County Borough of Doncaster Education Authority and was a constituent college of the Sheffield University Institute of Education.

It had been the residence of an 18th-century Dean of York, John Fountayne, who is buried in the church there. Much of the building dates from this period, and was owned by the Montagu family.  The campus came complete with on-site halls of residence for students and 126 acres of idyllic countryside. Doncaster LEA bought the land for £10,300.

The High Melton campus was officially opened in 1952.

Waterdale campus
Post-war demands on the college were so great the Church View could no longer cope by itself. Work started on an ambitious development at Waterdale in the centre of town. Some 6,300 students enrolled at various sites.

Waterdale opened and became the headquarters of Doncaster Technical College in 1961. Church View remained as the specialist Arts Centre of the college. The estimated cost of development was £1.3million.

Developments

The Hub campus
After three years of extensive planning, college managers were given the go-ahead by Doncaster Metropolitan Borough Council to build a new, state-of-the-art campus on the town's waterfront.

The college released details of the new building – it was to be the flagship building for Doncaster's waterfront regeneration area and cover 33,500 sq ft.

The Hub, located on Chappell Drive in Doncaster, officially opened in September 2006. At the same time, the Church View and Waterdale campuses were closed to the public.

University Centre Doncaster
2004 saw Doncaster College establish its University Centre at the High Melton campus in partnership with the University of Hull. This is regarded as the first step toward a University of Doncaster.
A planned "Review of College Higher Education" was conducted by the Quality Assurance Agency for Higher Education (QAA) on 30 April–2 May 2013. The QAA review team formed the following judgements about the higher education provision at Doncaster College.

 The academic standards of the awards the college offers on behalf of its awarding bodies meet UK expectations for threshold standards.
 The quality of student learning opportunities at the college meets UK expectations.
 The quality of information produced by the college about its learning opportunities meets UK expectations.
 The enhancement of student learning opportunities at the college meets UK expectations. The QAA review team identified the following features of good practice at Doncaster College:
 The way in which the college has developed a distinct identity and ethos for its higher education provision, including the emphasis on staff scholarship and research.
 The high quality of the placement handbook for the BA (Hons) Early Childhood Studies and the Relate Institute Code of Practice on Placement Learning.

In 2017, the High Melton campus closure was announced with most services and delivery relocated to The Hub campus.

DN Colleges Group
On 1 November 2017, Doncaster College merged with Scunthorpe-based North Lindsey College, creating the DN Colleges Group.

Staff and students
The college employs around 760 staff and accommodates around 6,390 part and full-time students aged 16+.

Academics
In the latest Ofsted report, published in April 2016, the college was judged to be "Good" in all judgement aspects.

Campus

The Hub 
Situated in Doncaster's town centre, the £65-million Waterfront campus opened in September 2006, giving students access to some of the best educational facilities in the country. The Hub offers a wide variety of both higher and further education courses at the campus.

Principals
Anne Tyrrell was appointed Interim Joint Chief Executive in 2017, overseeing the merger with Scunthorpe-based North Lindsey College to create the DN Colleges Group.

References

External links 
 

Buildings and structures in Doncaster
Education in Doncaster
Further education colleges in South Yorkshire
Educational institutions established in 2006
2006 establishments in England